Maria Nurowska (3 March 1944 in Okółek – 3 February 2022) was a Polish novelist and short story writer.

Life 
She graduated from the University of Warsaw (1974) in  Polish and Slavic philology. She made her debut in the " Literature " weekly. She was a member of the Polish Writers' Association .

Works 

 Małżeństwo Marii Kowalskiej – sztuka teatralna (drama)
 Przerwa w podróży – sztuka teatralna
 Nie strzelać do organisty – opowiadania (1975)
 Moje życie z Marlonem Brando (1976)
 Po tamtej stronie śmierć (1977)
 Wyspa na lądzie (1979) 
 Reszta świata (1981) 
 Kontredans (1983)
 Sprawa honoru (1983)
 Innego życia nie będzie (1987)
 Postscriptum (1989)
 Hiszpańskie oczy (1990)
 Listy miłości (1991)
 Panny i wdowy – Saga: Zniewolenie (1991), Zdrada, Poker (1991), Piołun (1992), Czyściec (1992).  
 Gry małżeńskie (1994)
 Rosyjski kochanek (1996)
 Wiek samotności (1996)
 Tango dla trojga (1997)
 Miłośnica (1998)
 Niemiecki taniec (2000)
 Mój przyjaciel zdrajca  (2002)
 Imię twoje – cykl: Imię twoje... (2002); Powrót do Lwowa (2005); Dwie miłości (2006);
 Gorzki romans (2003)
 Księżyc nad Zakopanem (2006)
 Anders (2008)
 Sprawa Niny S. (2009)
 Nakarmić wilki (2010)
 Wybór Anny (2010)
 Requiem dla wilka (2011)
 Drzwi do piekła (2012)
 Dom na krawędzi (2012)
 Sergiusz, Czesław, Jadwiga (2013)
 Matka i córka. Maria Nurowska i Tatiana Raczyńska w rozmowach z Martą Mizuro (2013)
 Zabójca (2014)
 Miłość rano, miłość wieczorem (2014)
 Wariatka z Komańczy (2015)
 Bohaterowie są zmęczeni (2016)
 Dziesięć godzin (2017)

Works in English 

 Ephespiele. translator Albrecht Lempp, Frankfurt a.M. S.Fischer. 1995.
 Seen from above : [screenplay]

Further reading 

 Maria Nurowska : a portrait of a women's writer, Monash University, Dept. of German Studies and Slavic Studies, Clayton, 1996

References 

1944 births
2022 deaths
20th-century Polish novelists
20th-century Polish writers
21st-century Polish novelists
21st-century Polish writers
20th-century Polish women writers
21st-century Polish women writers
University of Warsaw alumni
People from Sejny County